Lewis Pugh Williamson (April 23, 1801-Oct. 14, 1865) was an American politician and planter.

He was born in Northampton County, North Carolina, April 23, 1801.

He graduated from Yale College in 1821.  When but little more than twenty-one years of age, he was elected a member of the Legislature of North Carolina for his native county, and served for two successive years In 1827 he removed to Somerville, Tennessee, where he continued to reside until his death.

His principal occupation was that of a planter; but he had also the care of many estates, both large and small, of deceased friends, and the ability and kindness with which these trusts were discharged, commended him especially to the respect and affection of the community in which he lived. He was an active promoter, by public efforts, of religion and temperance and of the economic interests of society, and in his earnest advocacy of these interests acquired reputation and power as an orator. His religious connection was with the Methodist Church, of which for the greater part of his life he was a zealous and valued member.

In 1824 he was married to Miss Mary E. Littlejohn, of North Carolina, who survived him.  He died at the residence of his daughter in Memphis, Tennessee, Oct. 14, 1865, aged 64 years.

External links

1801 births
1865 deaths
People from Northampton County, North Carolina
Members of the North Carolina General Assembly
Yale College alumni
19th-century American politicians
People from Somerville, Tennessee